My Little Monster is a 2012 romantic comedy Japanese anime based on the manga written and illustrated by Robico. The story follows the relationship between Haru Yoshida, a cheerful and seemingly delinquent boy and Shizuku Mizutani, a socially awkward girl who devotes herself to obtaining academic success.

The anime is produced by Brain's Base and directed by Hiro Kaburaki, along with series composition by Noboru Takagi, character designs by Tomohiro Kishi, art direction by Chikako Shibata and soundtrack music by Masato Nakayama. The series premiered on TV Tokyo on October 2, 2012 with later airings on TVO, TVh, TSC, TVA and TVQ. The series was picked up by Crunchyroll for online simulcast streaming in North America and other select parts of the world. The thirteen episode series was followed by an OAD episode on August 12, 2013. Aniplex released the series in Japan on seven Blu-ray and DVD volumes starting on November 21, 2012. NIS America licensed the series for release in North America.



Episode list

Home media
Aniplex released the series in Japan on seven Blu-ray and DVD volumes between November 21, 2012 and May 22, 2013. NIS America will release the series on a single Blu-ray and DVD volume on June 30, 2015 which will include Japanese audio with English subtitles.

Notes

References

External links
Official anime website

My Little Monster